The 1898 All-Ireland Senior Football Championship Final was the eleventh All-Ireland Final and the deciding match of the 1898 All-Ireland Senior Football Championship, an inter-county Gaelic football tournament for the top teams in Ireland. 

Dublin, who led 1-6 to 0-3 at the interval, were the winners, with Joe Ledwidge scoring both goals. The captain of the winning team was Matt Rea.

At this time, club teams represented their counties with the Geraldines club representing Dublin and Waterford represented by the Erin's Hope club of Dungarvan.

It was the fifth of six All-Ireland football titles won by Dublin in the 1890s.

References

final
All-Ireland Senior Football Championship Finals
Dublin county football team matches
Waterford county football team matches